United Nations Security Council resolution 1392, adopted unanimously on 31 January 2002, after recalling previous resolutions on East Timor (Timor-Leste), particularly resolutions 1272 (1999) and 1338 (2001), the Council extended the mandate of the United Nations Transitional Administration in East Timor (UNTAET) until 20 May 2002.

The Security Council commended the work of UNTAET and the Special Representative of the Secretary-General in laying the foundations for the transition of East Timor to independence from Indonesia. It recalled an endorsement of the Constituent Assembly to declare independence on 20 May 2002. The Secretary-General Kofi Annan had recommended that the mandate be extended until independence was achieved and the Council awaited proposals from the Secretary-General for a successor United Nations mission post-independence.

UNTAET had been reducing its size due to the stabilisation of the situation in East Timor, and Resolution 1392 was the final time its mandate was extended before the establishment of the United Nations Mission of Support to East Timor.

See also
 1999 East Timorese crisis
 East Timor Special Autonomy Referendum
 Indonesian occupation of East Timor
 List of United Nations Security Council Resolutions 1301 to 1400 (2000–2002)
 United Nations Mission in East Timor

References

External links
 
Text of the Resolution at undocs.org

 1392
2002 in East Timor
2002 in Indonesia
 1392
 1392
January 2002 events